"She Won’t Talk to Me" is a song by American recording artist Luther Vandross released in 1988. It is the second single from his album Any Love. The song was a top five U.S. R&B hit, top 20 dance play hit, and a #30 pop hit on Billboard’s Hot 100. Vandross performed the song on the January 28, 1989 episode of Saturday Night Live.

Charts

References

1988 singles
1988 songs
Luther Vandross songs
Epic Records singles
Songs written by Hubert Eaves III
Songs written by Luther Vandross